Keki M. Mistry (born 7 November 1954) is the vice chairman and CEO of Housing Development Finance Corporation (HDFC).

Early life
Mistry was born on 7 November 1954 in Mumbai India to a Parsi family. Mistry completed his school education from Campion School, Mumbai and a bachelor's degree in commerce from  Sydenham college. Mistry is a Chartered Accountant from Institute of Chartered Accountants of India.

HDFC
Mistry joined HDFC in 1981 as an assistant manager accounts, after serving different roles, was appointed as vice chairman and CEO on 1 January 2010.

Associations
Mistry is also an executive director HDFC, director HDFC ERGO, non-executive Independent director at Sun Pharmaceutical, Industries director GRUH Finance, director HDFC Standard Life Insurance, non-executive & Independent director of HCL Technologies, director BSE, member Advisory Board Cox & Kings, non-executive non-Independent director at HDFC Bank, director at IL&FS Securities Services and Mahindra Holidays and Resorts India.

Family
Mistry is married to Arnaaz, they have a daughter Tinaz, and lives in Mumbai.

References

External links
 Official profile at HDFC Bank website

Living people
Indian chief executives
Parsi people from Mumbai
Businesspeople from Mumbai
1954 births
Indian accountants
HDFC Group